Television in Algeria was launched in 1956.

Most-viewed channels
Viewing shares, January 2015:

See also

 Media of Algeria
 List of newspapers in Algeria
 List of radio stations in Africa: Algeria
 Internet in Algeria

References

 
1956 establishments in Algeria
Television stations